Ian Peter Marchant  (born 14 March 1958) is an English writer, broadcaster and performer born in Guildford, England. He is best known for his non-fiction—mainly travel writing and memoir—but he has also written two novels and several other books, as well as short stories and newspaper articles. Following the completion of Parallel Lines and The Longest Crawl he has been invited to contribute to several programmes and newspaper features on the topics of railway travel and pub culture, and is often quoted in reviews of other books on these topics. He has made several programmes for BBC Radio and for UK regional television. Marchant is also a Lecturer in Creative Writing in the School of English at Birmingham City University.

Career

Books
Parallel Lines (2003) examines the history of the British railway system and meets people involved with it. The Times described it as "wonderfully funny...by turns vulgar, cutting, lyrical, erudite and satirical. But what really makes the book — especially for fellow addicts — is the attention to railway detail."

The Longest Crawl (2006) describes a journey through the pubs of Britain, from the southernmost to the northernmost, taking in the history of Britain's relationship with alcohol. Nick Lezard in The Guardian chose it as his Book of the Week, commenting "he has a way of telling a story, a pleasing tone, and a way of shoving in a lot of information - and philosophy, too, at one point - without a trace of lecturing. It's a big, fat affirmation of life, and Lord knows, we can all do with one of them from time to time."

Something of the Night (2012) is subtitled "A journey through the darkness of the British Isles" and includes facts about what happens at night; but it is also a very personal book, looking at the author's own relationship with various aspects of night-time.  The London Evening Standard, noting that the contents included "straw mattresses, fireworks, Bonfire Night in Lewes, pop music, floodlit football matches...the Northern Irish linen industry...ex-girlfriends...nightingales, death" concluded that Marchant "carries us through all this, with patience, good humour, self-lacerating honesty and an immense amount of charm. I don't see how anyone could fail to like it."

Broadcasting
Ian Marchant's 2011 programme for BBC Radio 4, The Ghost Trains of Old England was featured on the station's Pick of the Week. His BBC Radio 3 programme in the same year, Walking with Attitude, was chosen as a radio highlight by the Radio Times and The Guardian. In 2012 the Radio Times described his North and South programme as "arrestingly well-written."
Some of his work includes:
 North and South: Across the Great Divide, Radio Four, February 2012
 The Sunday Feature, Walking With Attitude, Radio Three, December 2011
 The Completists, Radio Four, February 2011
 The Ghost Trains of Old England, Radio Four, October 2010
 The Archive Hour, Radio Four, September 2010
 Top Deck, half hour documentary for Radio Four, broadcast January 2009.
 A Load of Rubbish, five-part series for Radio Four, broadcast  December 2008
Presenter/co-writer of Fun For Some, 4-part documentary/light entertainment series for ITV Border, broadcast April/May 2008
Presenter of Thomas Telford, half hour documentary for ITV Border, broadcast Oct. 2007. Nominated for Royal Television Society Award, best local documentary 2007.

Drama and performing
The drama White Open Spaces was staged at the Edinburgh Festival and nominated for an Arts Council Decibel Award in 2008. As part of the act "Your Dad", Ian Marchant has performed at Glastonbury Festival, Secret Garden Party, Eden Festival and Sheep Music. An article about his live performances was featured by The Observer in 2009.

Bibliography
Juggling for a Degree - Experiences of mature students n further education - 1995, Innovations in Higher Education, co-editor with Hilary Arksey.
In Southern Waters - 1999, Victor Gollancz
The Battle For Dole Acre - 2001, Weidenfeld & Nicolson
Crypts, Caves and Tunnels of London - 2002, Watling Street Publishing
Men and Models - 2003, New Holland
Parallel Lines  - 2003, Bloomsbury
The Longest Crawl - 2006, Bloomsbury
Something of the Night -  2012, Simon and Schuster
A Hero for High Times - 2018, Jonathan Cape

References

External links

Living people
English travel writers
1958 births